Thanh Hóa Football Club (Thanh Hóa FC) was the name of a former football team in the province of Thanh Hóa. Previously, it was a business unit of administrative expenses ranging from office under the management of cultural and sports tourism in Thanh Hóa. In 18 May 01 2010, the club is officially disbanded.

History
History of Football Team formerly known as the Thanh Hóa Youth team had played since 1962–1964, the year after the police men were called Thanh Hóa Football club contributions generation the players, the elite police team competition with teams of police of the socialist bloc.

Team competition in 2000 and decline dropped the lowest grade in the system of the football tournament in Vietnam. People's Committee of Thanh Hóa province decision to establish Thanh Hóa football team.
May 11, 2005 team called Halida Thanh Hóa.

From the second phase of the V-League 2008 tournament, team transferred to the corporation and the name of Cong Thanh Cement Industry.

June 25, 2009, the club's back office management of culture, Sports anh Tuorism of Thanh Hóa, fully titled: Club Soccer Teams.

Date 18 May 01, 2010, Mr. Vương Văn Việt, deputy chairman of Thanh Hóa province had disbanded decision signed to the team activitive.

Achievement
In period 1962–1980: Team usually played in the resolution and explains the movement of Ministry of Public Security of Vietnam.
From 1980–1985: Playing in the Championship at A2 level, in Vietnam. And the A2 Grade Championship in 1985 team had jump upon A1 level to gain promotion.
In 1986 played in the A1 championship, Vietnam. In step 1, Team was competitive in table A. 2 won, 3 drawn,7 lost, effect-goal defeat was 8–18, gaining seven points, ranked 7 / 7 on Table A.
In 1987 still play in the A1 level. Period 1, competition on table B. Result: 4 won, 5 drawn, 7 lost, effect-goal defeats were 19–25, reaching 12 points. Ranked No. 6 / 9 Table B.
In 1988, has no organized tournament.
In 1989, a period of play in table C. Result: won 4, drawn 4, lost 4, signal-loss goal is 12–13, ranked 7 / 11, reached the second stage competition. Phase 2 in Group 1 competition. Results: in March, losing 3 and rank 3 / 7.
In 1990 rated 5 / 6 Group A, not a series of stages through
In 1991, competing in Group C Stage 1, achievement: won 1, drawn 2, lost 7, effect-goal defeat was 5–14, rated 6 / 6.
1992, A1 relegation.

From 1993–1994 season, reaching a point all season. A2 relegation.
From 1995–2000, competed in the A2. U19 championship in 1997 Vietnam.
Class of 2000 by the Vietnam Football Federation, the Thanh Hóa Youth Championship tournament in 3 (the lowest rating system has four). In 2000, Thanh Hóa Youth Group A and took most rank 2.
In 2001, champion 2 and gain a promotion.
In 2002, ranking 5 / 12 Division in Vietnam.
In 2003, ranked 3 / 12 first-class championship in Vietnam.
In 2004, competed in Vietnam with a first class achievement: won 6, drawn 8, lost 8, at 26 points, ranking 6 / 12.

lost 9, effect-goal defeat was 19–18, reaching 21 points, ranking 7 / 12.

In 2005, the Championship tournament in Vietnam with achievement: won 7, drawn 6, lost 9, at 21 points, ranking 7 / 12.
In 2006, playing in the Championship class in Vietnam. Result: won 12, drawn 12, lost 2, signal-loss goal is 43–19, ranked 2 / 14. Professional gain promotion.
In 2007, competed in the national championship V-League. Results: Phase 1 formula ranked No. 2. Full finished the season ranked 9 / 14, won 8 games, drawn 10 matches, losing eight games. Scored 34 points to reach 27 goals, conceding 30 goals (including three goals by the organizers were lost in treatment for 6), fined 46 yellow cards, two red cards.
In 2008, competed in V-League 2008. Total number of matches won 26 games in which eight games, losing 9 games, drawn 9 matches. Total number of goals scored is 25 goals, conceding 32 goals. 32 total points, final 10/14 ranking.
In 2009 competed in V-League 2009. 14/14 final ranking, was to play in the Championship in 2010.
Date 18/01/2010 permanently disbanded because of lack of funding for that.

Coaches

References

Association football clubs established in 1962
Thanh Hóa
Football clubs in Vietnam
1962 establishments in Vietnam
2010 disestablishments in Vietnam
Thanh Hóa FC (1962)